A Uranus-crosser is a minor planet whose orbit crosses that of Uranus. The numbered Uranus-crossers (as of 2005) are listed below. Most, if not all, are centaurs.

Notes: † inner-grazer; ‡ outer-grazer

 2060 Chiron †
 5145 Pholus
 5335 Damocles
 7066 Nessus
 8405 Asbolus
 10199 Chariklo †
 10370 Hylonome ‡
 20461 Dioretsa
 (29981) 1999 TD10
 42355 Typhon
 (44594) 1999 OX3
 49036 Pelion
 52975 Cyllarus
 54598 Bienor †
 55576 Amycus
 (65407) 2002 RP120
 65489 Ceto
 (73480) 2002 PN34
 83982 Crantor
 (87555) 2000 QB243
 (88269) 2001 KF77 ‡
 (95626) 2002 GZ32

See also 
 List of centaurs (small Solar System bodies)
 List of Mercury-crossing minor planets
 List of Venus-crossing minor planets
 List of Earth-crossing minor planets
 List of Mars-crossing minor planets
 List of Jupiter-crossing minor planets
 List of Saturn-crossing minor planets
 List of Neptune-crossing minor planets

Uranus
Uranus-crossing
Uranus-crossing
Minor planets